Njarðvík is an ancient farm in northeast Iceland. The descendants of its settlers are featured in several of the Sagas of Icelanders.

History

Viking Age
The history of Njarðvík can be traced back to the settlement of Iceland, when Thorkel the Wise claimed all the land around the bay of Njarðvík. His great-grandson Ketil Thrym lived at Njarðvík and became a chieftain after his father, Thidrandi the Old. Several other notable 10th- and 11th-century Icelanders were related to this family, who are known as the "House of Njarðvík" (Old Norse Njarðvíkingar). The Saga of the People of Laxardal cites a lost "Saga of the House of Njarðvík," which may refer to a medieval text that no longer exists or else was renamed, or to an oral tradition.

Sagas
Njarðvík is referenced in the following medieval Icelandic texts:
 The Book of Settlements
 The Short Saga of Gunnar, Thidrandi's Killer
 The Saga of Droplaug's Sons
 The Saga of the People of Fljotsdal
 The Saga of the People of Laxardal

References 

Populated places in Iceland
Sagas of Icelanders
Farms in Iceland